WYRY (104.9 MHz, "104.9 Nash Icon") is a commercial FM radio station licensed to Hinsdale, New Hampshire, and serving parts of New Hampshire, Vermont and Massachusetts.  The station is owned by William Tucker and William Steele, Jr., through licensee Tri-Valley Broadcasting, LLC.  It airs a country music radio format.  Many of the shows are syndicated from Westwood One's Nash Icon Network.

The station has been assigned the WYRY call letters by the Federal Communications Commission since May 14, 1984.

The transmitter site is on Gunn Mountain, off Old Hinsdale Road in Winchester.  There are incorrect reports circulating that it is on the same land that was home to WRLP-TV, channel 32's transmitter, a local NBC affiliate repeating WWLP-TV's programming, until April 1978, when the channel 32 transmitter was dismantled and shipped to Utah, where channel 32's owner, William L. Putnam, was starting a new station.

On August 3, 2015, WYRY rebranded as "104.9 Nash Icon."

Translators
WYRY also broadcasts on the following translators:

Previous logo

References

External links
 

 
 
 
 

YRY
Cheshire County, New Hampshire
Greenfield, Massachusetts
Country radio stations in the United States
Keene, New Hampshire
Radio stations established in 1987